The 2012 season was Brann's 26th consecutive year in Tippeligaen, It was Rune Skarsfjord's second full season as the club's manager. Brann competed in the Tippeligaen, finishing 6th, and the 2012 Norwegian Football Cup where they were knocked out by eventual winners IL Hødd at the semi-final stage .

Squad

Transfers

Winter

In:

Out:

Summer

In:

Out:

Competitions

Tippeligaen

Results summary

Results by round

Results

Table

Norwegian Cup

Squad statistics

Appearances and goals

|-
|colspan="14"|Players who appeared for Brann no longer at the club:

|}

Goal scorers

Disciplinary record

References

SK Brann seasons
Brann